Zoltan Crișan (3 May 1955 – 14 October 2003) was a Romanian international footballer of Hungarian ethnicity who played for FC Baia Mare, Universitatea Craiova, FC Bihor Oradea, Olt Scornicești and Chimia Râmnicu Vâlcea. He was semifinalist of UEFA Cup with Universitatea Craiova in 1983. After he ended his playing career, he coached Aurul Brad in Romania and Montefano in Italy. Ion Jianu a Romanian journalist, wrote a book about his life called Patimile lui Crișan (The Passions of Crișan) published in 2004. Crișan died of tuberculosis on 14 October 2003.

Honours

Club
Universitatea Craiova
 Divizia A: 1979–80, 1980–81
 Cupa României: 1976–77, 1977–78, 1980–81, 1982–83

Individual
 304 games in Divizia A, 50 goals scored.
 41 caps for Romania, 4 goals scored.
 30 games in European Cup, Cup Winners' Cup and UEFA Cup, 5 goals scored.

Notes

References 

 
 

1955 births
2003 deaths
Sportspeople from Oradea
Romanian footballers
Olympic footballers of Romania
Liga I players
Liga II players
CS Minaur Baia Mare (football) players
CS Universitatea Craiova players
FC Bihor Oradea players
FC Olt Scornicești players
Chimia Râmnicu Vâlcea players
Association football wingers
Romania international footballers
Romanian football managers
Romanian expatriate football managers
Romanian expatriate sportspeople in Italy
Romanian sportspeople of Hungarian descent
21st-century deaths from tuberculosis
Tuberculosis deaths in Romania